Henri-Armand Viguier (23 September 1868 – 11 November 1934) was a French fencer. He competed in the men's masters foil event at the 1900 Summer Olympics.

References

External links
 

1868 births
1934 deaths
French male foil fencers
Olympic fencers of France
Fencers at the 1900 Summer Olympics
Sportspeople from Tarn (department)